Simeon Raykov (born 11 November 1989) is a Bulgarian footballer who plays as a winger for Gigant Saedinenie.

Career

Levski Sofia
In the summer of 2011, Simeon signed with PFC Levski Sofia. His kit number was chosen to be 11. On 19 July 2012, Raykov netted the only goal for Levski in the 1:0 home win over Bosnian club FK Sarajevo in a UEFA Europa League match, but the team from Sofia was eliminated from the competition after a 1:3 loss in the return leg.

On 19 August 2012, he scored 2 goals in the derby match against Botev Plovdiv and as a result of that he was chosen for Player of the Second Round in A PFG in a poll of newspaper "Football".

On 31 January 2017 it was announced that Simeon had joined Dutch football club Roda JC Kerkrade. His contract was terminated in June.

On 7 August 2017, Raykov signed a two year contract with Lokomotiv Plovdiv.

Career statistics

Honours

Club
Cherno More
 Bulgarian Cup: 2014–15
 Bulgarian Supercup: 2015

References

External links
 Profile at ThePlayersAgent 

1989 births
Living people
Footballers from Plovdiv
Bulgarian footballers
FC Spartak Plovdiv players
OFC Sliven 2000 players
FC Botev Vratsa players
PFC Levski Sofia players
PFC Cherno More Varna players
PFC Chernomorets Burgas players
PFC Lokomotiv Plovdiv players
First Professional Football League (Bulgaria) players
Second Professional Football League (Bulgaria) players
Roda JC Kerkrade players
Eredivisie players
Bulgarian expatriate footballers
Bulgarian expatriate sportspeople in the Netherlands
Expatriate footballers in the Netherlands
Association football wingers